Lake Avenue Congregational Church  is a historic church located at 393 N. Lake Avenue, Pasadena, California. It is a member of the Conservative Congregational Christian Conference. Lake Avenue Congregational Church was founded in Pasadena in 1896. The congregation's first minister was Allen Hastings.  William Waterhouse, the mayor of Pasadena, was one of the earliest members and donated property to build their first building. The Worship Center and Family Life buildings were completed in 1989. The former sanctuary, now known as the Chapel, is used for a Sunday morning service by the Spanish-speaking community, Communidad de las Américas.

⠀  ⠀ ⠀

Ties with Fuller Theological Seminary
Charles E. Fuller joined Lake Avenue Church in 1933 and became friends with the Senior Pastor James Henry Hutchins, a graduate of the Moody Bible Institute.  Hutchins kept the church away from the Liberal Christianity that was common in Congregationalism at the time. Fuller held its first classes in the Sunday School rooms of LACC. According to C. Peter Wagner, many members of the Fuller faculty and some Board Members were members of the church, including Wagner himself who would be ordained by the church's denomination.

Notable Ministers 
Raymond C. Ortlund Sr. – hosted radio program The Haven of Rest
Paul Cedar – former President of Evangelical Free Church of America
John Piper – ordained at Lake Avenue Church

References

Churches in Pasadena, California